Lusitanops dictyota is a species of sea snail, a marine gastropod mollusk in the family Raphitomidae.

Description

Distribution
This species occurs in the Arafura Sea off Papua New Guinea and off the Tanimbar Island, Indonesia.

References

 Mollusca Gastropoda: new deep-water turrid gastropods (Conoidea) from eastern Indonesia. Memoires du Museum National d'Histoire Naturelle, 172 1997: 325-355.

External links
 MNHN, Paris: holotype
 
 Intergovernmental Oceanographic Commission (IOC) of UNESCO. The Ocean Biogeographic Information System (OBIS)

dictyota
Gastropods described in 1997